Diane Yimga (born 27 April 1992) is a Congolese handball player for Reims Champagne HB and the Congolese national team.

She participated at the 2021 World Women's Handball Championship in Spain.

References

1992 births
Living people
Congolese female handball players